This is an overview of media in Vancouver, British Columbia.

Major newspapers

Vancouver has two major English-language daily newspapers, The Vancouver Sun (a broadsheet) and The Province (a tabloid). Both are published by Postmedia Network. There are also two national newspapers distributed in the city: The Globe and Mail, which began distribution of a "national edition" into B.C. in 1983, and in more recent years launched a three-page B.C. news section in an effort to increase its readership in the city.  The National Post, also owned by Postmedia, entered city markets only in the last few years but has very little British Columbia content.

Vancouver has four Chinese-language daily newspapers, Ming Pao, Sing Tao, World Journal and The Epoch Times. Ming Pao and Sing Tao cater to a Cantonese-speaking readership whereas World Journal and The Epoch Times target Mandarin speakers.

Vancouver business publications include the following: 

BC Business Mag (monthly)
Business Edge Vancouver (weekly)
Business in Vancouver (weekly)
Journal of Commerce BC (daily)
Make It Business (monthly)
Western Investor (monthly)

One free daily newspaper, Metro is published in the city from Monday to Friday. It contains a small number of local news stories.
	 
The Georgia Straight is a weekly "alternative" newspaper, though in addition to left-leaning news and opinion it also features upscale advertising for products such as condominiums and has lifestyle articles on topics such as health and style. Its most extensive sections are focused on entertainment and music features and listings. The Georgia Straight began as a counterculture newspaper in the 1960s, full of controversial politics and occasional "obscene" cartoons and pictures, including the hippie classic comic Harold Hedd. During this period the Straights owner and publisher, Dan MacLeod, was repeatedly harassed by the city and its anti-hippie mayor Tom Campbell. MacLeod's offices were repeatedly raided and he was beaten by police. During the 1970s MacLeod converted the publication to a much more entertainment-oriented publication, avoiding political content until the mid-1980s.

The Post Group Multimedia publishes 3 weekly newspapers: The Asian Pacific Post (Chinese), South Asian Post (Indo-Canadian), and The Filipino Post, for the three largest immigrant communities in the Lower Mainland.

The Express is the title used for an occasional union-published newspaper published by the press unions when they are on strike.

Neighbourhood newspapers

Radio
There are three main news radio stations in Vancouver: CBC Radio One, CKNW and NEWS 1130. There are several other talk, information, and sports stations, primarily on the AM band, and a variety of music stations, mostly on FM.

In addition, there are four campus and community licensed radio stations in the Vancouver market. CJSF-FM (SFU's Burnaby campus), CITR-FM (UBC's main campus), and CFML (BCIT's Burnaby campus) are staffed by students from their respective schools. CFRO (Vancouver Coop Radio) is located in Vancouver's Downtown Eastside. CJSF, CITR, and CFRO are members of the National Campus and Community Radio Association.

In addition, both KARI from Blaine, Washington (AM 550) and KWPZ from Lynden, Washington (FM 106.5) are usually considered part of the Vancouver radio market; KARI and KWPZ both maintain offices in Vancouver.

Internet radio
 LG73 www.lg73.ca, (classic soul, contemporary hits, and eclectic mix)
 CBC Radio 3 is primarily broadcast from Vancouver

Television
Vancouver is the third-largest television market in Canada, and the largest in western Canada. It is also the second-largest television production centre in North America after Los Angeles.

Global BC is the most popular evening newscast in the city, though CTV Vancouver, currently second in the ratings, has aggressively been trying to increase its market share — including the purchasing of a news helicopter known as 'Chopper 9'. In 2006, Global BC launched the Global One traffic helicopter for live traffic updates and breaking news. CBC also has local newscasts though they are far back in the ratings.

Vancouver (and London, Ontario) were the first two cities in Canada to be served by cable television, in 1952.

Vancouver and most of the Lower Mainland are served by Shaw Cable and by Delta Cable. Delta Cable is subsidiary of the Halifax-based telecommunications company EastLink. Telus TV also offers satellite television and IPTV service throughout most of Vancouver and the Lower Mainland.

Other over-the-air television stations licensed to Bellingham that are available terrestrially in Vancouver but not carried on cable are KBCB (channel 24), an affiliate of Sonlife Broadcasting Network on subchannels 24.1, in high definition, and 24.2, in standard definition; and K24IC-D (channel 28.1), a rebroadcaster of PBS station KBTC-TV Tacoma.

American network affiliates on Vancouver cable are from Seattle, Washington, including KOMO (ABC), KING (NBC), KIRO (CBS), KCTS (PBS), KSTW (The CW), and KCPQ (Fox).

Magazines
Boulevard Magazine, a west coast luxury lifestyle magazine serving the Chinese-speaking communities of Metro Vancouver, published monthly in English and in Chinese.
 Business in Vancouver (BIV) is a weekly business news journal
HUSH Magazine, a bi-monthly social commentary and lifestyle magazine for 25- to 40-year-olds, distributed to Downtown Vancouver
Megaphone Magazine, sharing stories that explore social justice, culture, politics, and independent arts in Vancouver and Victoria.
MONTECRISTO Magazine, a lifestyle quarterly for discerning Vancouverites, published four times a year
Resource World Magazine, a bi-monthly magazine distributed in 46 countries that reports on the business of mining and green technologies
Vancouver Magazine, a lifestyle magazine with some news features, published 10 times a year
What's in Magazine, a Chinese lifestyle magazine for new trends in the Asian community, published once a month
WestCoast Families, a family lifestyle magazine, published 6 times a year, plus specialty issues.

Online media
 BC Buzz with Dave Michael Garg, online TV & magazine outlet focused on the environment
 Cambie Report, local politics podcast
 Daily Hive (formerly Vancity Buzz), local news and lifestyle outlet
 HUSH Magazine, an editorial platform for lifestyle, social commentary and entertainment
 LifeVancouver, Japanese news and events site
 Jornal Brasil Vancouver, Brazilian community newspaper, events, classified ads and directory website
 PolitiCoast, provincial politics podcast
 Taiyangbao, a Chinese-language news website produced in association with The Vancouver Sun newspaper
 The Tyee, alternative news site
 Vancouver Desi, a South Asian news portal produced in association with The Province newspaper
 The Vancouver Observer, alternative local news site
 Vancouver Weekly, alternative news weekly site
 VIES Magazine, independent entertainment magazine in Vancouver, B.C. with focus on music, sports, food and beverage
 The West End Journal, independent online community website serving Vancouver's West End / Coal Harbour neighbourhoods

Media ownership
Vancouver has some of the most concentrated media ownership in all of Canada. The Vancouver Sun, The Province, the National Post, and 12 community newspapers are all owned by Postmedia Network. Partly in response to that concentration, a group of journalists — many of them ex-Sun employees — started up an online news publication, The Tyee, that posts news and opinion pieces on a nearly daily basis.

Ethnic media
As of the 2000s there were various formats of media catering to ethnic minorities. They included 80 newspapers, 24 magazines, 15 television stations, 15 radio stations, and 10 printed business directories and online publications. Daniel Ahadi and Catherine A. Murray, the authors of "Urban Mediascapes and Multicultural Flows: Assessing Vancouver’s Communication Infrastructure," wrote that publication turnover, or the creation and failure and publications, was very high.

References

See also
Hollywood North

 
Vancouver
Media, Vancouver
Vancouver-related lists